"Straight from the Heart" is the debut single of UK garage duo Doolally, later known as Shanks & Bigfoot, with vocals provided by Sharon Woolf. The song was first released in 1998, and reached the top 20 in the United Kingdom, peaking at No. 20. After the success of their UK number-one single "Sweet Like Chocolate" the following year, "Straight from the Heart" was re-released and peaked at No. 9 on the UK Singles Chart. The song also reached No. 1 on the UK Dance Singles Chart in both 1998 and 1999.

In 2018, the House & Garage Orchestra featuring Shelley Nelson on vocals recorded an orchestral version for the UK garage covers album Garage Classics.

Track listings
UK 12-inch single (1998)
A1. "Straight from the Heart" (Club Mix) – 6:30
A2. "Straight from the Heart" (Crazy Bank Mix) – 5:56
B1. "Straight from the Heart" (Funkforce Vocal Mix) – 7:03

UK CD single (1999)
 "Straight from the Heart" (Radio Edit) – 3:36
 "Straight from the Heart" (Tuff Jam Remix) – 6:10
 "Straight from the Heart" (Bump & Flex Mix) – 5:48

Charts

References

1998 songs
1998 debut singles
1999 singles
Locked On Records singles
Shanks & Bigfoot songs
XL Recordings singles
UK Independent Singles Chart number-one singles